Shadow Lawn is a historic building on the campus of Monmouth University in West Long Branch, Monmouth County, New Jersey, United States.  Built in 1927 for Hubert T. Parson, president of the F.W. Woolworth Company, it is one of the last large estate houses to be built before the Great Depression.  It was designated a National Historic Landmark in 1985 for its architecture.

Architecture
A three-bay section projects at the center of the main (south) facade, with a Doric columned single-story portico at its front. A dentillated cornice separates the second and third floors, and a balustrade surrounds the roof, with sculptures mounted on some of the corner columns. The interior has more than 100 rooms, with lavishly appointed public spaces. The main hall features a well-concealed Aeolian Skinner organ, and the basement houses a bowling alley that saw little use during the Parson's ownership.

History
The Shadow Lawn estate was first developed in the early 20th century by John A. McCall, president of the New York Life Insurance Company.  Its main house was a 52-room mansion, which in 1915 served as the summer White House for President Woodrow Wilson in 1916.  Wilson planned many aspects of his reelection campaign from that house.  In 1918, the estate was purchased by Hubert T. Parson, president of the F.W. Woolworth Company.  The main house was destroyed by fire in 1927, and Parson and his wife Maysie immediately embarked on building an ostentatious replacement.

Sparing no expense, they retained the noted Gilded Age architect Horace Trumbauer, and the design of the present building are credited to Trumbauer and his assistant, Julian Abele.  The exterior garden landscape was designed by the French landscape architect Achille Duchêne.  By the time the building was complete the Parsons had spent more than $10 million.  They had continued work despite the onset of the Great Depression, which eventually ruined their finances.  Unable to recoup his expenditures on the estate by selling it, the property was taken by the town for $100 in 1939.  After housing a girls' school for a time, it became part of Monmouth University in 1956.

Shadow Lawn was listed on the National Register of Historic Places in 1978 for its significance in art, architecture, and landscape architecture and then declared a National Historic Landmark in 1985.

The building was used to portray Oliver Warbucks' (Albert Finney) mansion in the film Annie.

The current building was renamed from Shadow Lawn to Woodrow Wilson Hall after Monmouth's acquisition of the estate, honoring Wilson's occupation of its predecessor.  In 2020, the building returned to its Shadow Lawn name, with the university citing Wilson's racist policies for the change.

See also
 List of residences of presidents of the United States

References

External links

New Jersey Arts text and photographs

Houses on the National Register of Historic Places in New Jersey
Houses in Monmouth County, New Jersey
National Historic Landmarks in New Jersey
Houses completed in 1927
Monmouth University
F. W. Woolworth Company buildings and structures
National Register of Historic Places in Monmouth County, New Jersey
West Long Branch, New Jersey
New Jersey Register of Historic Places
Historic American Buildings Survey in New Jersey
Beaux-Arts architecture in New Jersey
1927 establishments in New Jersey